The Flute sonata in E minor (HWV 375) is thought to have been composed by George Frideric Handel, for flute and basso continuo. The date of composition of the work is unknown, but it was first published in 1730. Other catalogues of Handel's music have referred to the work as HG xlviii, 134; and HHA iv/3,63.

The authenticity of the sonata as such is uncertain, though three of the movements were certainly composed by Handel, but for other instruments. It is referred to as "Halle Sonata No. 2" (in German "Hallenser Sonate Nr. 2"), following Chrysander's assumption that it was an early work, composed during Handel's boyhood in Halle, before 1703. This cannot be true for this particular sonata, however, because the first two movements are a transposition into E minor of the corresponding movements of the final version of the much-revised Sonata for oboe in C minor, HWV 366, which dates from 1711–12. The fourth movement, also, was originally a minuet in G minor for harpsichord, later printed in 1733, while the third movement is a Grave whose attribution to Handel is very doubtful. The Chrysander edition indicates that the work is for flute ("Traversa"), and published it as Sonata XVII.

A typical performance of the work takes almost seven minutes.

Movements
The work consists of four movements:

(Movements do not contain repeat markings unless indicated. The number of bars is taken from the Chrysander edition, and is the raw number in the manuscript—not including repeat markings.)

See also
Handel flute sonatas
List of solo sonatas by George Frideric Handel
XV Handel solo sonatas (publication by Chrysander)

References

Flute sonatas by George Frideric Handel